The Eugene C. Eppley Fine Arts Building is located on the Morningside College campus in Sioux City, Iowa. Built in 1966, it is regarded as "one of the finest music and arts facilities in the Midwest." The auditorium seats 1,400 and is noted for its acoustical qualities and the majestic Sanford Memorial Organ. The Helen Levitt Art Gallery is also located inside the building. The Sioux City Symphony Orchestra has used the Eppley for concerts since its opening.

History
The Eppley Fine Arts Building was built in 1966 by Chris Hansen Construction from designs by a local architectural firm called W.L. Beuttler and Son. Featuring a steel frame, brick, block, glazed tile, and stone masonry, cement and acoustical plaster and ceramic mosaic tile, the building was constructed for long term usage. A ceramic mosaic is situated at the main entrance.

References

Buildings and structures completed in 1966
Buildings and structures in Sioux City, Iowa
Morningside University
Tourist attractions in Sioux City, Iowa
Arts centers in Iowa
1966 establishments in Iowa
Event venues established in 1966
School buildings completed in 1966
Museums established in 1966